Bucak District is a district of the Burdur Province of Turkey. Its seat is the town of Bucak. Its area is 1,511 km2, and its population is 66,156 (2021).

Composition
There are three municipalities in Bucak District:
 Bucak
 Kızılkaya
 Kocaaliler

There are 35 villages in Bucak District:

 Alkaya 
 Anbahan 
 Avdancık 
 Belören 
 Beşkonak 
 Boğazköy 
 Çamlık
 Çobanpınarı 
 Dağarcık 
 Dutalanı 
 Elsazı 
 Gündoğdu
 İncirdere 
 Karaaliler 
 Karacaören 
 Karaot 
 Karapınar 
 Karaseki 
 Kargı 
 Kavacık 
 Kayı 
 Keçili 
 Kestel 
 Kızılcaağaç 
 Kızıllı 
 Kızılseki 
 Kuşbaba 
 Kuyubaşı 
 Seydiköy 
 Susuz 
 Taşyayla 
 Uğurlu 
 Ürkütlü
 Üzümlübel 
 Yüreğil

References

Districts of Burdur Province